CJOS-FM (Bounce 92.3) is a Canadian radio station, that broadcasts an adult hits format at 92.3 FM in Owen Sound, Ontario. The station is owned by Bell Media.

History

On May 9, 2008, Larche Communications received approval from the CRTC to operate a new FM radio station at 92.3 MHz in Owen Sound.  The CJOS call sign formerly belonged to a religious station in Caronport, Saskatchewan, which ceased broadcasting in 2006.

On June 9, 2010, CJOS received CRTC approval to decrease their effective radiated power from 20,000 watts to 9,400 watts. The station officially signed on the air with a mix of rock music and classic hits as 92.3 The Dock - The Greatest Hits of All Time on July 26, 2010. 

On August 9, 2017, Bell Media announced that it would acquire CJOS from Larche Communications. Bell Media received approval from the CRTC on February 14, 2018.

As part of a mass format reorganization by Bell Media, on May 18, 2021, CJOS dropped its 92.3 The Dock branding, shifted to adult hits, and adopted the Bounce branding.

References

External links
Bounce 92.3
 
 

Jos
Jos
Radio stations established in 2006
2006 establishments in Ontario
JOS